Frank Sima Turay Tucker (born 20 December 1976) is a Sierra Leonean sprinter. He competed in the men's 4 × 400 metres relay at the 1996 Summer Olympics.

References

External links
 

1976 births
Living people
Athletes (track and field) at the 1996 Summer Olympics
Sierra Leonean male sprinters
Olympic athletes of Sierra Leone
Place of birth missing (living people)